Crepidula plana, common name the eastern white slippersnail, is a species of sea snail, a marine gastropod mollusk in the family Calyptraeidae, the slipper snails or slipper limpets, cup-and-saucer snails, and hat snails.  This species is characterized by a flat white shell, a white body, and development that includes a planktotrophic larval stage.  This species often occurs inside large gastropod shells that are inhabited by hermit crabs. In this case the shells are often extremely flat, and often recurved.

Like all slipper snails, Crepidula plana is a filter feeder. They brood their offspring in clusters of transparent capsules between the substrate, the propodium and the neck.

Crepidula plana is native to the East Coast of North America, where it ranges from Canada to North Carolina.  It has also been reported as introduced into San Francisco Bay.  Reports of this species in the Gulf of Mexico or south of North Carolina are incorrect, and result from taxonomic confusion with other flat white species of Crepidula, including Crepidula atrasolea, and Crepidula depressa.

Distribution
In the past, Crepidula plana has been reported to range from 48°N to 38°S; 97.75°W to 34.9°W.  Much of this distribution information is incorrect, because it has not been updated to reflect the current taxonomic understanding of this group of similar species.

The distribution has been reported to include:
 Canada: Nova Scotia, New Brunswick
 USA: Massachusetts, New York, New Jersey, Maryland, Virginia, North Carolina, South Carolina, Georgia, East Florida, West Florida, Louisiana, Flower Garden Banks (East & West), Texas
 Mexico: Tamaulipas, Tabasco, Veracruz, Campeche State, Cayo Arcas, Campeche, Yucatán State, Campeche Bank, Alacran Reef, Quintana Roo
 Costa Rica
 Panama
 Colombia
 Venezuela: Gulf of Venezuela, Sucre, Isla Margarita
 Bermuda
 Jamaica
 Virgin Islands: St. Croix
 St. Vincent & the Grenadines: Grenada
 Surinam
 Brazil: Amapa, Ceara, Pernambuco, Rio de Janeiro, São Paulo

However, since the 1980s, DNA sequence data, allozyme data and developmental data have provided evidencethat the flat white Crepidula from Eastern North America is composed to at least three distinct species.  C. plana actually ranges only from Nova Scotia and New Brunswick south to Georgia or northern Florida.  Records of C. plana in Southern Florida and the Gulf of Mexico are almost certainly misidentified C. atrasolea or C. depressa.  The identity of the flat white Crepidula species which occurs south of the Gulf of Mexico (in the Caribbean) needs to be re-examined, as it is certainly not C. plana.

Description
The shell is flat and white, the internal septum is flat, and there are no muscle scars inside the shell.  The length of the shell is 15 to 35 mm. The maximum recorded shell length is 43 mm.

Crepidula plana produces planktotrophic larvae.

Habitat
The minimum recorded depth for this species is 0 m; the maximum recorded depth is 110 m.

References
This article incorporates CC-BY-SA-3.0 text from the reference

External links
http://www.stri.si.edu/sites/collinlab/tree_species/group_c_plana.html
http://www.stri.si.edu/sites/collinlab/tree_species/details.php?id=15

Calyptraeidae
Gastropods described in 1822